Robert Livingston Tillotson (1788 - July 22, 1878 Rhinebeck, Dutchess County, New York) was an American lawyer and politician.

Life
He was the son of Thomas Tillotson and Margaret Livingston Tillotson, and grandson of Judge grandson of Robert R. Livingston. "Chancellor" Livingston was his uncle.

He was Secretary of State of New York from 1816 to 1817.

He was  U.S. Attorney for the Southern District of New York from 1819 to 1828. During his tenure, the Norwegian sloop Restoration was seized by the port authorities upon its arrival at New York, and he filed the papers in the US District Court. The owners, Norwegian immigrants, got the ship released by a pardon signed by President John Quincy Adams.

Sources
The New York Times, Died, [death notice] July 25, 1878. (PDF)

Secretaries of State of New York (state)
1786 births
1878 deaths
Livingston family
United States Attorneys for the Southern District of New York
19th-century American politicians